James Bye may refer to:

James Bye (footballer) (1920–1995), English footballer
James Bye (actor) (born 1984), British actor